De Vit, DeVit, or de Vit is a surname. Notable people with the surname include:

Tony De Vit (1957–1998), English DJ and music producer
Vincenzo de Vit (1810–1892), Italian scholar and historian

See also
Cosima De Vito
Mia De Vits (born 1950), Belgian politician